Nielsen Fjord is a fjord 2 nautical miles (3.7 km) wide between Cape North and Gregory Bluffs on the north coast of Victoria Land. Named by ANARE (Australian National Antarctic Research Expeditions) for Captain Hans Nielsen, master of the  used in exploring this coast, 1962.

Fjords of Antarctica
Landforms of Victoria Land
Pennell Coast